Socle may refer to:
 Socle (mathematics), an algebraic object generated by minimal subobjects or by an eigenspace of an automorphism
 Socle (architecture), a plinth that supports a pedestal, statue, or column